Neil John O'Boyle was president of the Irish Republican Brotherhood from 1907 to 1910. Seán Ó Faoláin later characterised O'Boyle in Belfast and Tom Clarke in Dublin as typical of the 'older realists' of the movement in the period prior to the Easter Rising. Through the intervention of Bulmer Hobson, an ageing O'Boyle relinquished his position as Ulster representative on the Supreme Council in favour of Denis McCullough.

O'Boyle was born in Randalstown, Co Antrim.

References

Members of the Irish Republican Brotherhood
Year of birth missing
Year of death missing
People from Belfast